The list of ship launches in 1854 includes a chronological list of some ships launched in 1854.



References

Sources

1854
Ship launches